Day for My Love is a 1976 Czechoslovak drama film directed by Juraj Herz. It was entered into the 27th Berlin International Film Festival.

Cast
 Eva Sitta as Hanka (as Eva Píchová)
 Milada Černá
 Emma Černá
 Lubomír Černík as Kabát
 Vlastimil Harapes
 Jan Hartl as Mirek
 Jaroslav Heyduk as Bernard
 Sylva Kamenická
 Zofie Kanyzová-Veselá as Helena
 Dana Medřická as Petr's mother
 Jitka Nováková
 Jiřina Šejbalová
 Karel Smyczek
 Zdeněk Srstka as Man in the Pub
 Eva Svobodová as Cleaning woman
 Marta Vančurová

References

External links
 

1976 films
1970s Czech-language films
1976 drama films
Films directed by Juraj Herz
Films scored by Petr Hapka
Czechoslovak drama films
1970s Czech films